Coronado Butte is a -elevation summit located in the Grand Canyon, in Coconino County of Arizona, United States. Coronado Butte is named for Francisco Vázquez de Coronado (1510–1554), the explorer whose 1540 expedition was the first European sighting of the Grand Canyon, among other landmarks. This geographical feature's name was officially adopted in 1906 by the U.S. Board on Geographic Names. The first ascent was made by John Hance and tourist prior to 1900, in the 1890s. According to the Köppen climate classification system, Coronado Butte is located in a cold semi-arid climate zone.

Geology

The summit of Coronado Butte is composed of cream-colored, cliff-forming, Permian Coconino Sandstone with a Kaibab Limestone caprock. The sandstone, which is the third-youngest of the strata in the Grand Canyon, was deposited 265 million years ago as sand dunes. Below the Coconino Sandstone is slope-forming, Permian Hermit Formation, which in turn overlays the Pennsylvanian-Permian Supai Group. Further down are strata of Mississippian Redwall Limestone, and Cambrian Tonto Group. Precipitation runoff from Coronado Butte drains north into the nearby Colorado River.

Gallery

See also
 Geology of the Grand Canyon area

References

External links 

 Weather forecast: National Weather Service

Grand Canyon
Grand Canyon, South Rim
Landforms of Coconino County, Arizona
Mountains of Arizona
Mountains of Coconino County, Arizona
Colorado Plateau
Grand Canyon National Park
North American 2000 m summits
Buttes of Arizona
Sandstone formations of the United States